Omega (originally, Delerium Tremens) was a former settlement in Nevada County, California, United States, first populated in 1850 by a single miner, J.A. Dixon, working a claim during the California Gold Rush. In the mid 1850s, following the introduction of hydraulic mining operations nearby, the town prospered. Omega had a post office (which operated from 1857 to 1891), and needed to convert a residence into a jail in late 1858.

References

Former settlements in Nevada County, California
Former populated places in California
1857 establishments in California